Krstinja is a village in Croatia. It is connected by the D216 highway.

References

Populated places in Karlovac County
Serb communities in Croatia